Route 114A is an alternate state route to Rhode Island Route 114, located along the Massachusetts – Rhode Island border in East Providence, RI and Seekonk, MA. The road begins and ends within East Providence in Rhode Island at Route 114. Most of the road, however, is located within Seekonk and designated as Massachusetts Route 114A.

Route description

Route 114A begins as Mink Road at an intersection with Route 114 in East Providence. It crosses into the Massachusetts town of Seekonk after  and continues north as Mink Street then Fall River Avenue through Seekonk center. Route 114A continues north back into Rhode Island, where it ends back at Route 114, which is overlapped with U.S. Route 1A (US 1A) at this point in East Providence.

This is the only instance in Massachusetts of an "A" or "alternate" route carrying the numerics for a highway signed in another state, as Rhode Island's Route 114 does not enter Massachusetts. Only three other such instances of this exist in New England: New Hampshire Route 113B (a loop off of Maine Route 113), Vermont Route 10A (a spur of New Hampshire Route 10), and Vermont Route 22A (a spur of New York Route 22).

History

Route 114A was not commissioned until some time in the 1960s.

Major intersections

References

External links

2019 Highway Map, Rhode Island

114A
114A
Transportation in Providence County, Rhode Island
Transportation in Bristol County, Massachusetts
East Providence, Rhode Island
Seekonk, Massachusetts